West Hemlock Creek is a tributary of Hemlock Creek in Montour County and Columbia County, in Pennsylvania, in the United States. The creek has at least one unnamed tributary. West Hemlock Creek and its unnamed tributary are considered by the Pennsylvania Department of Environmental Protection to be impaired. The creek is designated as a coldwater fishery. Rock formations in the watershed include the Catskill Formation and the Trimemrs Rock Formation.

Course
West Hemlock Creek begins in a valley in eastern West Hemlock Township, near Hedge Road. It flows east for a short distance to the edge of the township and then flows along the township line for some distance. The creek then turns southeast into Hemlock Township, Columbia County.

In Hemlock Township, the valley of West Hemlock Creek gets deeper. The creek continues southeast and east for a few miles. It then leaves the valley and almost immediately reaches its confluence with Hemlock Creek near the community of Buckhorn.

Tributaries
Tributaries of West Hemlock Creek include the unnamed tributary UNT 65640353.

Hydrology, geography, and geology
 of West Hemlock Creek is considered by the Pennsylvania Department of Environmental Protection to be impaired. The cause of the impairment is siltation due to agricultural activity.  of an unnamed tributary of the creek also experience the same impairment for the same reason.

The lower reaches of the creek lie over rock of the Trimmers Rock Formation. The upper reaches are on rock of the Irish Valley Member of the Catskill Formation. It is also near the West Hemlock Creek Fault.

The areas along West Hemlock Creek that are a hazard for floods are mostly not developed.

Watershed
The land between the creek and Interstate 80 is forested.

Biology
West Hemlock Creek is designated as a coldwater fishery. The slopes of the valley of West Hemlock Creek contain a riparian buffer that is composed mainly of eastern hemlock. There are also forested seeps on the creek. According to the Columbia County Natural Areas Inventory, these may contain "sensitive ecological features".

See also
Frozen Run
List of tributaries of Fishing Creek (North Branch Susquehanna River)

References

Rivers of Montour County, Pennsylvania
Rivers of Columbia County, Pennsylvania
Rivers of Pennsylvania